Events from the year 1757 in Ireland.

Incumbent
Monarch: George II

Events
 Catholic Committee, to press for repeal of the penal laws against Roman Catholics, is established by Charles O'Conor, John Curry and Mr. Wyse of Waterford. O'Conor publishes The Protestant Interest of Ireland Considered.
 The Wide Streets Commission (officially the Commissioners for making Wide and Convenient Ways, Streets and Passages) is established by Act of Parliament at the request of Dublin Corporation to govern standards on the layout of streets, bridges, buildings and other architectural considerations, influential in the creation of Georgian Dublin.
 St Patrick's Hospital for Imbeciles, established under the will of Jonathan Swift, opens in Dublin.
 December 8 – the Rotunda Hospital opens in Dublin.
 December 31 – the title of Viscount Ligonier of Enniskillen is created in the Peerage of Ireland in favour of Field Marshal John Ligonier.
 Kilbeggan Distillery established.

Births
15 May – John Hely-Hutchinson, 2nd Earl of Donoughmore, soldier and politician (died 1832)
17 March – Alexander Knox, theological writer (died 1831)
Approximate date – Jonah Barrington, judge and memoirist (died 1834 in France)

Deaths
10 June – Henry Temple, 1st Viscount Palmerston, politician (born c.1673)
16 July – Chichester Fortescue, politician (born 1718)
3 November – Lieutenant colonel George Monro, army officer (born 1700)
Sampson Towgood Roch, miniature painter (died 1847)
William Saurin, lawyer and politician (died 1839)

References

 
Years of the 18th century in Ireland
Ireland
1750s in Ireland